Munsur Ali (born 25 May 1978) is a Bangladeshi-born British film producer, screenwriter, director and social entrepreneur, Labour Party politician, and councillor for Portsoken ward. He is best known for his film Shongram, the first time a British film has been simultaneously written, produced and directed by a British Bangladeshi.

Early life
Ali was born in Bangladesh, arrived to England at the age of two in 1980 and grew up in Aldgate where he still lives. He attended a Church of England school, studied Arabic/Islam on weekends and Bangla after school, and also taught himself to speak in Urdu.

From an early age, Ali was influenced by films and in his late teens he took an interest in looking at alternative points of view in mainstream cinema. Going to the cinema a lot as a teenager gave him his inspiration.

Ali attended Sir John Cass Redcoat School and says he "didn't do too well at GCSE." He learned film and photography at Epping Forest College. However, he "was confused and couldn't commit to A-level," so he left in the second year. In 2004, he graduated with a 2:1 in BA Film and Broadcast Productions from London Metropolitan University.

Ali's father was born in British India (now Bangladesh). Ali's father has been in the UK since early 1950s. He gave up his Bangladeshi citizenship and became a British citizen. The majority of Ali's relatives live in the UK.

Filmmaking career
After graduating, Ali made documentaries and short films on social issues such as policing, knife crime and gang violence.

In 2003, he set up an independent video and film production company Spotlight UK before formalising it as a company in 2005. Since then he has worked alongside global US, UK and Bollywood names. In September 2006, he founded Limelight Film Awards, an initiative to identify and celebrate emerging film talent. With the first event taking place in 2007, it is one of the largest independent short film awards ceremony. In 2009, he founded Epic Media Wedding Productions and set about specialising in producing cinematic quality wedding videos.

In 2014, Ali wrote, directed and produced his debut feature film Shongram. The film is a romantic drama set during the 1971 Bangladesh Liberation War. He worked on the project for three years and it was the first time a British film was simultaneously written, produced and directed by a British Bangladeshi.

In February, March and June 2014, he was interviewed by Nadia Ali on BBC Asian Network.

Ali is working on two new films: Cinema which is about a young actor who enters the world of cinema and discovers a whole world of exploitation, corruption, drugs, thugs and betrayal, and The Final Message which is a supernatural horror based around Hebrew scriptures, Christian scriptures and the Quran.

Political career
On 23 March 2017, Ali was elected as a Labour Party councillor for Portsoken ward in Aldgate in his home town of the City of London, where Labour won five seats. Ali's decision to contest came after he was unhappy with the recent multimillion-pound housing development plans that is affecting his community's future.

In June 2017, he was inaugurated at the Guildhall in London as a member of the Court of Common Council that governs the City of London.

Awards
In 2012, Ali was presented with a Civic Award by Tower Hamlets, in recognition for his contribution of promoting young artists through the Limelight Film Awards.

Personal life
Ali is a Muslim. He lives in Aldgate, London. In December 2011, while working on the film Shongram, Ali met and became close friends with Bangladeshi actress Dilruba Yasmeen Ruhee. On 3 September 2014, Ali married Ruhee in Dhaka, Bangladesh, this was followed by a gaye holud ceremony on 4 September and a wedding reception on 5 September.

Filmography

See also
British Bangladeshi
List of British Bangladeshis

References

External links

Limelight Film Awards website

1978 births
Living people
Bangladeshi Muslims
British Muslims
Bangladeshi emigrants to England
British people of Bangladeshi descent
Naturalised citizens of the United Kingdom
Bangladeshi film producers
British film producers
Bangladeshi film directors
British male screenwriters
British film editors
Muslim writers
British Asian writers
Social entrepreneurs
Councilmen of the City of London
Labour Party (UK) councillors
British politicians of Bangladeshi descent
Film directors from London
People from the London Borough of Tower Hamlets
People educated at Sir John Cass Redcoat School
Alumni of Epping Forest College
Alumni of London Metropolitan University
21st-century British screenwriters